Fort Frances Municipal Airport  is located  northwest of Fort Frances, Ontario, Canada.

The airport is classified as an airport of entry by Nav Canada and is staffed by the Canada Border Services Agency (CBSA) on a call-out basis from the Fort Frances-International Falls International Bridge. CBSA officers at this airport can handle general aviation aircraft only, with no more than 15 passengers.

Airlines and destinations

See also
Fort Frances Water Aerodrome
Falls International Airport - located south of International Falls, Minnesota

References

External links

Certified airports in Rainy River District
Transport in Fort Frances